The Troup County Courthouse, Annex, and Jail are three buildings built in 1939.  Their construction was funded by the Public Works Administration, as a project under the New Deal of President Franklin D. Roosevelt's administration to invest in infrastructure.  They were designed by architect William J.J. Chase in Stripped Classical style.

LaGrange was in the news in January 2017 for the public apology of its police chief and mayor for the city's failure to prevent the 1940 lynching of Austin Callaway, a young black man. Callaway was taken by a gang of white men from the jail, which presumably was this Troup County Jail.

The old Troup County Courthouse is used in the 21st century as the Juvenile Courthouse. The jail behind it was torn down in 2001 when the Troup County Government Center was built.

A former private Victorian home, built in 1892, was acquired by the county and operated as the Troup County Jail until replaced by the new facility in 1939. After being used in other ways, the building was restored and adapted for use since 2001 as the Chattahoochee Valley Art Museum / LaGrange Art Museum.

References

Courthouses on the National Register of Historic Places in Georgia (U.S. state)
Government buildings completed in 1939
National Register of Historic Places in Troup County, Georgia
County courthouses in Georgia (U.S. state)